Abu al-Abbas Ahmad ibn Abd al-Aziz, known by the regnal name al-Mustansir, was Marinid Sultan of Morocco from 1374 to 1384.

Life 
Ahmad's predecessor Muhammad Abu Zayyan had ascended the throne as a minor in 1372 on the death of his father, Abu Faris Abd al-Aziz.
The Nasrid ruler Muhammed V of Granada sent two Marinid princes to Morocco whom he had been holding captive in Granada: Ahmad Abu al-Abbas and Abdul Rahman bin Yaflusin, and supported them in taking control of northern Morocco.

Ahmad became the Sultan of Fez in 1374, while Abdul Rahman became the independent Sultan of Marrakesh.
Ibn al-Khatib, a former vizier of Granada and distinguished man of letters, had taken refuge in Morocco.  
Abu Abbas had him executed as Muhammed V wished, and handed over Sabta (Ceuta) to Muhammad V.

Abu Abbas was temporarily replaced in 1384 by Musa ibn Faris al-Mutawakkil.
His deposition was engineered by the Nasrids.  Musa ibn Faris Abu Faris al-Mutawakkil was a disabled son of the former Sultan Abu Inan Faris.
Musa Ben Faris ruled until 1386, and was replaced by Muhammad ibn Ahmad al-Wathiq, who ruled until 1387.
Abu Abbas then regained the throne.
After his restoration, Abu Abbas began to give more power to the vizirs.
While Morocco was at peace, Abu Abbas reconquered Tlemcen and Algiers.

Abu Al-Abbas died in 1393 in Taza, and Abd al-Aziz II ibn Ahmad II was designated the new sultan. 
During the troubles that followed, the Christian sovereigns carried the war into Morocco.

References
Citations

Sources

People from Fez, Morocco
Marinid sultans of Morocco
14th-century Berber people
14th-century Moroccan people
14th-century monarchs in Africa
1393 deaths
Year of birth unknown